The 2009 Atlético Nacional season was Atlético Nacional's 61st season in the Categoría Primera A. In this season, the club only participated in the league and cup, as they failed to qualify to CONMEBOL tournaments like the Copa Libertadores and Sudamericana.

For this season manager and club legend Luis Fernando Suárez was brought in, who won a league championship with Nacional in 1999, and won the Copa Libertadores with them as a player. However, he was sacked after only winning two of 16 matches in all competitions, being replaced by interim manager José Santa for the rest of the Apertura tournament.

This was one of Nacional's most disappointing seasons: in the Apertura tournament they finished second-to-last in the table. The Finalizacion tournament was better, where they finished seventh in the regular season table and made the playoffs, but didn't qualify for the finals. They had a decent run in the cup, where they were eliminated in the semi-finals by Santa Fe on penalties.

Team kit
This year Atlético Nacional changed their kit manufacturer to Adidas as their one-year contract with marathon expired. Postobón was still their shirt sponsor though, making this year their tenth year sponsoring them.

|

|

|
|}

Squad
As of January 29, 2009

Reserve & Youth Squad

Transfers

In:
 Andrés Orozco From Sport Club Internacional
 Baiano From Vasco da Gama
 Aldo Ramírez From Monarcas Morelia
 Juan Carlos Mariño From  Cienciano (January)
 Armando Carrillo from Deportivo Cali (June)
 Jairo Patiño from San Luis (June)
 Ezequiel Maggiolo from Indios de Ciudad Juárez (June)
 Gastón Pezzuti from  Gimnasia y Esgrima Jujuy (June)
Loan Return:  Marlon Piedrahita from Envigado (June)
Loan Return:  Yeison Devoz from Real Cartagena (June)

Out:
Loan:  Marlon Piedrahita to Envigado (January)
Loan:  Yeison Devoz to Real Cartagena (January)
 Carlos Villagra To Deportivo Pasto
 Carlos Díaz To Deportivo Pereira
 Oscar Passo To Real Cartagena
 Carmelo Valencia To Millonarios
Juan Carlos Mariño to Deportivo Cali (May)

Statistics

Appearances and goals

|}

Disciplinary record 
Includes all competitive matches. Players with 1 card or more included only.

Last updated on 19 April 2009.

*  = 1 suspension withdrawn ** = 2 suspensions withdrawn

Pre-season

Copa Cajasai

Copa Cafam

Friendly matches
This game was played by the alternate roster of Atlético Nacional since it was played the same day of the match of Copa Cafam. As for Envigado they also played with their alternative team.

Copa Mustang Apertura 
The first two games for Atlético Nacional were played behind closed doors, due to the disturbances made by the fans in the last season's final game against La Equidad. The organization were fined around $5,000. Atlético Nacional struggled and lost the first six games of the season, finally winning their first match against Millonarios. Nacional then went on a six-match winless run, until manager Luis Fernando Suárez resigned from the team a few days after losing to Deportivo Cali on 19 April, later on 22 April José Santa would take over.

Results by round

Results 

Actual 14th round match; moved because of a clash with Boyacá Chicó's schedule as they were playing in Copa Libertadores.

Copa Colombia

Results

References 

2009